Harold Roy Mahony (24 August 1900 – 14 March 1973) was an Australian rules footballer who played with South Melbourne in the Victorian Football League (VFL).

Notes

External links 

1900 births
1973 deaths
Australian rules footballers from Geelong
Sydney Swans players